The YF-75D is a liquid cryogenic rocket engine burning liquid hydrogen and liquid oxygen in a closed expander cycle. It is China's third generation of upper stage cryogenic propellant engine, after the YF-73 and the YF-75. It is used in a dual engine mount in the H5-2 second stage of the Long March 5 launch vehicles. Within the mount, each engine can gimbal individually to enable thrust vectoring control. As its predecessor, the YF-75 it can adjust its mixture ratio to optimize propellant consumption. But as an additional improvement, it can do multiple restarts, against the single one of its predecessor.

The combustion chamber required a redesign to keep the power balance. Since the expander cycle uses the heat extracted from the cooling circuits to drive the turbines, the chamber had to be lengthened and the cooling passages redesigned. The engine uses a redesigned hydrogen turbine. It uses an axial two-staged low pressure ratio subsonic turbine that operates at 65,000rpm, which is between the second and third critical speed. It rests on dual elastic support dampers around the ceramic ball bearings.

YF-75E
The YF-75E engine is based on the YF-75D engine, and the nozzle ratio is increased to improve its working performance. It is expected to be used in the third stage of the Long March 10 launch vehicle.

Specifications

References

External links
 Engine Manufacturer

Rocket engines using hydrogen propellant
Rocket engines of China
Rocket engines using the expander cycle